NFL GameDay 2004 is the ninth video game in the NFL GameDay series. It was developed by 989 Sports and published Sony Computer Entertainment America for the PlayStation and the PlayStation 2 in 2003. On the cover is LaDainian Tomlinson.

It is the last NFL GameDay to be released on PlayStation 2

Reception

The game received "mixed" reviews on both platforms according to the review aggregation website Metacritic.

References

External links
 

2003 video games
NFL GameDay video games
North America-exclusive video games
PlayStation (console) games
PlayStation 2 games
Video games developed in the United States
Video games set in 2004